Tower Peak is a peak, 855 m, whose rock exposure stands out clearly from an evenly contoured icefield 5 nautical miles (9 km) northwest of Longing Gap, in northern Graham Land. First charted and given this descriptive name by the Falkland Islands Dependencies Survey (FIDS), 1945.

Mountains of Graham Land
Nordenskjöld Coast